Alex Auma Obanda (born 25 December 1987) is an Kenyan cricketer who has played first-class cricket for Kenya Select.

Domestic career
When the side participated in the Logan Cup in 2007, Obanda made his first class debut and had a good series, making 296 runs at 37.00. A right-handed batsman, he scored a century in their draw against Centrals at Kwekwe. Obanda was the only Kenyan player to take part in the 2011–12 Stanbic Bank 20 Series, representing the Southern Rocks He played two matches without scoring a run.

International career
The World Twenty20 Qualifier was held in March 2012. Kenya failed to qualify for the 2012 ICC World Twenty20 later than year, though Obanda scored 298 runs from 9 matches with two half-centuries and was Kenya's leading run-scorer in the tournament (seventh overall).

In January 2018, he was named in Kenya's squad for the 2018 ICC World Cricket League Division Two tournament. In July 2018, he scored the first century of the 2018–19 ICC World Twenty20 Africa Qualifier tournament, when Kenya played Tanzania in the Eastern sub region group.

In September 2018, he was named in Kenya's squad for the 2018 Africa T20 Cup. He was the leading run-scorer for Kenya in the tournament, with 127 runs in four matches. The following month, he was named in Kenya's squad for the 2018 ICC World Cricket League Division Three tournament in Oman.

In May 2019, he was named in Kenya's squad for the Regional Finals of the 2018–19 ICC T20 World Cup Africa Qualifier tournament in Uganda. In September 2019, he was named in Kenya's squad for the 2019 ICC T20 World Cup Qualifier tournament in the United Arab Emirates. In October 2021, he was named in Kenya's squad for the Regional Final of the 2021 ICC Men's T20 World Cup Africa Qualifier tournament in Rwanda.

References

External links

1987 births
Living people
Kenyan cricketers
Kenya One Day International cricketers
Kenya Twenty20 International cricketers
Eastern Aces cricketers
Cricketers from Nairobi
Cricketers at the 2011 Cricket World Cup